Coden may refer to:
 Coden, Alabama, an American fishing village
 Nova Coden, a Polish autogyro design
 CODEN, a bibliographic identifier
 Francille Rusan Coden, American historian

See also 
 Koden (disambiguation)
 Codeine (disambiguation)